East Lake (French: Lac de l'Est) is a lake crossing the Canada-US border located in:
 the municipality of Mont-Carmel, Quebec in Kamouraska Regional County Municipality (RCM), in the administrative region of Bas-Saint-Laurent in province Quebec, in Canada;
 the township T17 R14 WELS of Aroostook County, in North Maine Woods, in state of Maine, in United States.

The Northwest shore of the lake has a resort development on the northern part of the lake with the access road.

Location 
This lake is crossed at its southern limit, by border between the province of Quebec and Maine; this border is located in the Southeast part of the lake.

The mouth of East Lake is located in the township T17 R14 Wels, in North Maine Woods, in the Maine to:
  Southeast of the Canada-US border;
  Northwest of the confluence of the Chimenticook River located in Maine;
  Southeast of the coast of St. Lawrence River at the level of Sainte-Anne-de-la-Pocatière, Quebec.

Toponym

The place name has been known for over a century. It refers to its position East of Lake Sainte Anne, an important water body in this border region in the neighboring municipality of Sainte-Perpétue, Chaudière-Appalaches, Quebec. Another name appeared in 1944 on the Township map: Lake Kijemquispam, presumably a Mi'kmaq place name.

The place name "Lac de l’Est " (English: Eastern Lake) was formalized on December 5, 1968, by the Commission de toponymie du Québec (English: Quebec Places Names Board).

Economical activities

This is the logging of the Highlands in Kamouraska that brought people to stand at the head of the lake (northern part). In 1894, the first sawmill is opened by a contractor from New Brunswick, who did the log drive logs toward Saint John River. A winter hamlet quickly developed, serviced by a post office as of 1898. Other mills have succeeded, activity peaking towards 1930 when 300 people permanently living there.

Later, we started to designate this hamlet by the name of Eatonville, but the name of "Lac de l’Est" (English: Eastern Lake) remained. After the 1960, cutting wood decreased and camps of lumberjacks were replaced by cottages, vacationers attracted by a large beach along the lake.

See also 

 Spikes River, stream
 Chimenticook River, stream
 Saint John River (Bay of Fundy), stream
 Kamouraska Regional County Municipality
 North Maine Woods, a geographical region in northern Maine

References 
 Noms et lieux du Québec (Names and places of Quebec), book printed in 1994 and 1996, Commission de toponymie du Québec (Geographical Places Names Board) as an illustrated dictionary and released as a CD-ROM produced by the Micro-Intel company in 1997 from this dictionary.

Lakes of Bas-Saint-Laurent
Tributaries of the Saint John River (Bay of Fundy)
Lakes of Aroostook County, Maine